Widely Distributed Records was a Chicago, Illinois-based record label. It was founded in 1991 by Jack Frank, the sometime manager of the Chicago-based band Green, whose White Soul album and Bittersweet EP were released on the label that February 28.

Artists
Algebra Suicide
Green
Hip Deep Trilogy
Joy Poppers
The Lilacs
Milk, Inc.
The label also released Rehearsal for Retirement, a compilation album featuring tracks by Hip Deep Trilogy, Fingerjays, Algebra Suicide, and the Lilacs, in November 1992.

References

External links

Record labels established in 1991
1991 establishments in Illinois
Rock record labels
Defunct companies based in Chicago